Cuccurullo is an Italian surname. Notable people with the surname include:

 Cookie Cuccurullo (1918–1983), American baseball player
 Warren Cuccurullo (born 1956), American musician, singer-songwriter, restaurant owner, and body builder

Italian-language surnames